"Don't Bring Me Down" is a 1979 song by the Electric Light Orchestra.

Don't Bring Me Down may also refer to:

 "Don't Bring Me Down" (The Animals song), 1966
 "Don't Bring Me Down" (The Pretty Things song), 1964
 "Don't Bring Me Down" (Sia song), 2003
 "Don't Bring Me Down", a song by Brock Downey, 2004
 "Don't Bring Me Down", a song by Feeder, a B-side from "Day In Day Out", 1999
 "Hey! (Don't Bring Me Down)", a song by TVXQ from Mirotic, 2008

See also
 Don't Let Me Down (disambiguation)